Edward Ashton  may refer to:
Edward Ashton (colonel) (died 1658), English royalist colonel
Teddy Ashton (1906–1978), English footballer
Edward L. Ashton House, Iowa City
Edward Ashton, American science fiction author

See also
Ned Ashton (disambiguation)
Edward Ashton Gaskin Stuart (1918–2001), educator and labor leader